The Michigan–Michigan State soccer rivalry is an American college soccer rivalry between the University of Michigan Wolverines and Michigan State University Spartans.

History
The winner of each year's game receives the Big Bear Trophy. The first game was played October 13, 1956, which saw the Spartans defeat the Wolverine club team 3-1 in East Lansing. The Spartans played Michigan's club team 24 times between 1956 and 1991, amassing a 18–1–5 record. In 2000, Michigan added soccer as a Varsity sport and on October 15, 2000, the rivalry between the varsity club officially began with the Spartans winning 2–1 in double overtime in East Lansing. The trophy originated in 2000 when Michigan head coach Steve Burns purchased the wooden-bear sculpture to commemorate the revival of the rivalry. Burns said that he and Michigan State head coach Joe Baum collaborated on a trophy game because they "wanted to have some kind of trophy for this rivalry that the teams can pass back and forth. We hope that it takes a life on its own." In the Spring of 2021, the restructured Big Ten soccer season saw the two teams matched up twice in the regular season for the first time, however neither game would contest the Big Bear trophy.

Game results
See footnotes

Michigan State leads the varsity series, 15–12–3. The Big Bear trophy series is solely a result of the regular season meeting, excluding NCAA and Big Ten postseason games. In the trophy series, Michigan State leads, 13–6–3 through the 2022 season.

See also
 Michigan–Michigan State football rivalry
 Michigan–Michigan State men's basketball rivalry
 Michigan–Michigan State men's ice hockey rivalry
 Michigan–Michigan State women's basketball rivalry

References 

College soccer rivalries in the United States
Big Ten Conference rivalries
Michigan Wolverines men's soccer
Michigan State Spartans men's soccer
Awards established in 2000
1956 establishments in Michigan